Carex texensis, the Texas sedge, is a species of flowering plant in the sedge family, Cyperaceae. It is endemic to the eastern, central, and southern United States.

Its culms are 10–30 cm in height, and 0.5–1 mm wide basally to 0.4–0.5 mm wide distally. The leaves are green with the widest leaf blades 1–1.7 mm wide.

References

 L. H. Bailey, Mem. Torrey Bot. Club. 5: 97. 1894.
 Carex rosea Schkuhr ex Willdenow var. texensis Torrey ex L. H. Bailey, Mem. Torrey Bot. Club 1: 57. 1889
 Ladybird Johnson Wildflower Center
 Flora of North America

texensis
Plants described in 1894
Taxa named by Liberty Hyde Bailey